St. Charles is a city in southern Bear Lake County, Idaho, United States, that is located near the northwestern shore of Bear Lake. Its population was 131 at the 2010 census, down from 156 in 2000.

Description
Ranching and recreation are the major influences on the community. Its small population live in houses scattered through a number of blocks of rustic streets interspersed with fields and agricultural buildings. A number of summer homes for visitors to the lake have added to the community. St. Charles sits at the mouth of St. Charles Canyon, a scenic inlet into the neighboring mountains, where hiking and camping opportunities are available.

History
St. Charles was settled in May 1864 by Mormon pioneers. As did most Mormon communities along the Idaho–Utah border, early settlers believed they were in the Territory of Utah. In 1864, the Utah territorial legislature created Richland County (shortened to Rich in 1868) for the Bear Lake Valley settlements, designating St. Charles as its county seat. The 1870 Decennial Census of the United States listed St. Charles and 10 other Idaho Bear Lake Valley settlements under Rich County, Utah.

But when the official survey of the Idaho–Utah line was completed on February 15, 1872, it placed St. Charles and the rest of the northern Bear Lake Valley settlements in Oneida County, Idaho Territory.

The area developed as an agricultural community, and the population was never substantial. In the 20th century it began to attract tourists and persons seeking a recreation area. Some second homes and retirement homes have been built here, but the population has declined.

Notable residents
Sculptor Gutzon Borglum (1867–1941) was born in St. Charles to Danish immigrant parents. He is best known for his sculptured portraits of American presidents carved in the stone of Mount Rushmore.

Geography

Demographics

2010 census
At the 2010 census there were 131 people in 53 households, including 35 families, in the city. The racial makeup of the city was 98.5% White and 1.5% from two or more races.

Of the 53 households 26.4% had children under the age of 18 living with them, 58.5% were married couples living together, 7.5% had a female householder with no husband present, and 34.0% were non-families. 32.1% of households were one person and 13.2% were one person aged 65 or older. The average household size was 2.47 and the average family size was 3.17.

The median age was 42.8 years. 29.8% of residents were under the age of 18; 3.1% were between the ages of 18 and 24; 19.1% were from 25 to 44; 26.8% were from 45 to 64; and 21.4% were 65 or older. The gender makeup of the city was 49.6% male and 50.4% female.

2000 census
At the 2000 census there were 156 people in 57 households, including 44 families, in the city. The racial makeup of the city was 98.08% White, 1.28% Native American, 0.64% from other races. Hispanic or Latino of any race were 1.92%.

Of the 57 households 31.6% had children under the age of 18 living with them, 77.2% were married couples living together, and 22.8% were non-families. 19.3% of households were one person and 17.5% were one person aged 65 or older. The average household size was 2.74 and the average family size was 3.16.

The age distribution was 29.5% under the age of 18, 1.9% from 18 to 24, 19.2% from 25 to 44, 21.2% from 45 to 64, and 28.2% 65 or older. The median age was 45 years. For every 100 females, there were 102.6 males. For every 100 females age 18 and over, there were 96.4 males.

The median household income was $21,923 and the median family income  was $27,500. Males had a median income of $25,500 versus $31,250 for females. The per capita income for the city was $11,755. About 10.9% of families and 7.3% of the population were below the poverty line, including none of those under the age of eighteen and 11.5% of those sixty five or over.

Highway
 - U.S. Route 89, to Paris, Montpelier (north) and Logan, Utah (southwest)

See also
 List of cities in Idaho

References

External links

 
 Bear Lake Valley Convention & Visitors Bureau
 Bear Lake County School District #33
 http://www.idahohistory.net/Reference%20Series/0335.pdf

Cities in Bear Lake County, Idaho
Cities in Idaho
Populated places established in 1864